Bundesstraße (German for "federal highway"), abbreviated B, is the denotation for German and Austrian national highways.

Germany

Germany's Bundesstraßen network has a total length of about 40,000 km.
German Bundesstraßen are labelled with rectangular yellow signs with black numerals, as opposed to the white-on-blue markers of the Autobahn controlled-access highways. Bundesstraßen, like autobahns, are maintained by the federal agency of the Transport Ministry. In the German highway system they rank below autobahns, but above the Landesstraßen and Kreisstraßen maintained by the federal states and the districts respectively. The numbering was implemented by law in 1932 and has overall been retained up to today, except for those roads located in the former eastern territories of Germany.

One distinguishing characteristic between German Bundesstraßen and Autobahnen is that there usually is a general 100 km/h (62 mph) speed limit on federal highways out of built-up areas, as opposed to the merely advisory speed limit (Richtgeschwindigkeit) of 130 km/h (83 mph) in unmarked sections of the autobahns. However, a number of Bundesstraßen have been extended as expressways (dual carriageways) (colloquially called "Yellow Autobahns"), which can be compared to motorway-grade A roads in the U.K. like the A1(M). Many of these have speed limits of usually 100–120 km/h, others have only an advisory speed limit like autobahns. Most sections of the federal highways are only single carriageway with one lane for each direction and no hard shoulder pull-out area.

The closest equivalent in the United States would be the U.S. highway system.

Austria

In contrast to Germany, according to a 2002 amendment of the Austrian federal road act, Bundesstraßen is the official term referring only to autobahns (Bundesstraßen A) and limited-access roads (Schnellstraßen, Bundesstraßen S). The administration of all other former federal highways (Bundesstraßen B) has passed to the federal states (Bundesländer).

Therefore, officially classified as Landesstraßen, they are still colloquially called Bundesstraßen and have retained their "B" designation (except for Vorarlberg), followed by the number and a name. They are marked by a blue square sign with white number and are per se priority roads.

Before 2002 there has been a further category of Bundesstraßen with circular yellow sign and black number that shows that this road has no fixed priority (right of way for users). A few yellow signs lived longer than 2002.

Motorway plans
Germany and Austria have plans to reconstruct and/or replace Bundesstraße as/by motorways (Autobahn), outside built-up areas, especially the important ones of 20 to 30 thousands kilometers of the ways in Germany. For Austria they have to replace another 8000 km by schnellstraße/motorways, then Schnellstraße have to be replaced by/rebuilt as motorways.

See also
 List of federal highways in Germany

External links
 

 
 

it:Bundesstraße
sv:Riksväg#Andra länder